This is an incomplete, chronological list of films produced in the Khmer language in the 2000s.

The falsely groundless rumor about a Thai Actress, Suvanant Kongyingclaiming that Angkorwat belonged to Thailand led All Thai Television series and movies that were once viewed on Khmer Channels to shut down for 5 years. Within the 5 years, nearly 60 Khmer movies were released each year. There were many big-scale films released within this 5 year-term: The Snake King's Child (2001), Tum and Teav:Romeo and Juliet (2003), Neang Neath (2004), The Crocodile (2005, and The Snake King's Grandchild (2006). More than 400 Cambodian films were released in this period of time.

List of Cambodian films of 2000
List of Cambodian films of 2001
List of Cambodian films of 2002
List of Cambodian films of 2003
List of Cambodian films of 2004
List of Cambodian films of 2005
List of Cambodian films of 2006
List of Cambodian films of 2007
List of Cambodian films of 2008
List of Cambodian films of 2009

See also 
List of Khmer entertainment companies
List of Khmer film actors
List of Khmer film directors

External links 
 Films from Cambodia at the Internet Movie Database
 Khmer-language films at the Internet Movie Database
 Filmography of Norodom Sihanouk

Films
Lists of 2000s films